In modern politics, law and order is the approach focusing on harsher enforcement and penalties as ways to reduce crime. Penalties for perpetrators of disorder may include longer terms of imprisonment, mandatory sentencing, three-strikes laws and even capital punishment in some countries.

This has been credited with facilitating greater militarisation of police and contributing to mass incarceration in the United States.
 
Supporters of "law and order" argue that incarceration is the most effective means of crime prevention. Opponents argue that a system of harsh criminal punishment is ultimately ineffective because it self-perpetuates crime and does not address underlying or systemic causes of crime. 

Despite the widespread popularity of "law and order" ideas and approaches between the 1960s to the 1980s exemplified by presidential candidates including Richard Nixon and Ronald Reagan running successfully on a "tough-on-crime" platform, statistics on crime showed a significant increase of crime throughout the 1970s and 1980s instead, and crime rates only began declining from the 1990s onwards.
 
To differing extents, crime has also been a prominent issue in Canadian, British, Australian, South African, French, German, and New Zealand politics.

Political issue in the United States 
Both the concept and the exact phrase "Law and order" became a powerful political theme in the United States during the late 1960s. The first prominent American politician to use the term in this era was Alabama governor George Wallace, who used the phrase as a political slogan and racial dog whistle in his 1968 presidential campaign. Other leading proponents were two Republicans, the governor of California Ronald Reagan and presidential candidate Richard Nixon. Nixon used the term to appeal to various demographic groups, including working class White ethnics in northern cities. Nixon attempted to discredit the Democratic Party in the eyes of these voters, blaming it for being soft on crime and rioters.

Previously, other politicians had used the term "law and order," although their use of the term was much less systematic and frequent than that of Wallace, Nixon, or Reagan. Political demand for "law and order" has been made much earlier before, by John Adams in the 1780s and 1790s. It was a political slogan in Kentucky around 1900 after the assassination of Governor William Goebel. The term was once used by Barry Goldwater in his run for president in 1964.

Michael Flamm argues that liberals were unable to craft a compelling message for anxious voters. Instead, they either ignored the crime crisis, claimed that law and order was a racist ruse, or maintained that social programs would solve the "root causes" of civil disorder, which by 1968 seemed increasingly unlikely and contributed to a loss of faith in the ability of the government to do what it was sworn to do—protect personal security and private property. Conservatives rejected the liberal notions. In 1966, House GOP leader Gerald Ford said "How long are we going to abdicate law and order in favor of a soft social theory that the man who heaves a brick through your window or tosses a firebomb into your car is simply the misunderstood and underprivileged product of a broken home?".

Flamm documents how conservatives constructed a persuasive message that argued that the Civil Rights Movement had contributed to racial unrest and President Lyndon B. Johnson's Great Society had rewarded rather than punished the perpetrators of violence. Conservatives demanded that the national government should promote respect for law and order and contempt for those who violated it, regardless of cause. In January 1965, Johnson himself called for a "war on crime", and with Congressional approval of the Law Enforcement Assistance Act of 1965 and Omnibus Crime Control and Safe Streets Act of 1968 directed federal funding to local police.

The number of prisoners tripled from 500,000 in 1980 to 1.5 million in 1994. Conservatives at the state level built many more prisons and convicts served much longer terms, with less parole. The paradigm asserts that prisoners serving longer sentences would be much older upon release, thus reducing the probability of subsequent offences.

Riots 

Although the Civil Rights Act of July 2, 1964 forbade all discrimination on the basis of race, in 1965 police brutality towards a black man during a traffic stop resulted in a major riot among the black community in the Watts neighborhood of Los Angeles, the government's response to which is considered by many to have been a failure. Indeed, every summer from 1964 through 1970 was a "long hot summer", though 1967 is particularly called that since 159 riots occurred that year. Additionally, after the April 4, 1968 murder of Martin Luther King, a new wave of riots broke out in over 100 cities, with nights of violence against police and looting and burning of local white-owned businesses. The inner neighborhoods of many major cities, such as Detroit, Los Angeles, Newark and New York, were burned out. National Guard and Army troops were called out. At one point machine gun units were stationed on the steps of the Capitol building in Washington to prevent rioters from burning it down.

Crimes 
Secondly there was a dramatic rise in violent street crime, including drug-related murders, as well as armed robberies, rapes and violent assaults. Inner city neighborhoods became far more violent and people tried to move out to safer ones. The number of violent crimes more than tripled from 288,000 in 1960 (including 9,110 murders) to 1,040,000 in 1975 (including 20,510 murders). Then the numbers levelled off.

In response to sharply rising rates of crime in the 1960s, treatment of criminal offenders, both accused and convicted, became a highly divisive topic in the 1968 U.S. Presidential Election. Republican Vice Presidential candidate Spiro Agnew, then the governor of Maryland, often used the expression; Agnew and Nixon won and were reelected in 1972.

Notorious crimes by released murderers that occurred in the 1980s and 1990s are often credited with influencing politics regarding the concept of "law and order". Most notably, the release of the murderer Willie Horton who committed a rape and a rampage of severe violence when he was released is generally credited with favoring the election of President George H. W. Bush over the man who released him, Massachusetts governor Michael Dukakis. Whatever the cause, Bush beat Dukakis by a margin of both popular and electoral college votes that has not been surpassed since 1988. The release of the murderer Reginald McFadden, who went on a serial murder and rape spree, by the acting governor of Pennsylvania, Mark Singel, may have been a contributing factor in the 1994 election of Pennsylvania governor Tom Ridge, in which Ridge defeated Singel by a margin of 45% to 39%.

Results
Advocates of stricter policies toward crime and those accused of crime have won many victories since the issue became important. Highlights include stringent laws dealing with the sale and use of illicit drugs. For example, the Rockefeller drug laws passed in New York state in 1973, and later, laws mandating tougher sentences for repeat offenders, such as the three-strikes laws adopted by many U.S. states starting in 1993 and the re-legalization of the death penalty in several states.

Opponents of these and similar laws have often accused advocates of racism. Civil rights groups have steadfastly opposed the trend toward harsher measures generally. The law-and-order issue caused a deep rift within the Democratic Party in the late 1960s and 1970s, and this rift was seen by many political scientists as a major contributing factor in Ronald Reagan's two successful presidential runs in 1980 and 1984. In both elections, millions of registered Democrats voted for Reagan, and they collectively became known as "Reagan Democrats". Many of these voters eventually changed their party registration and became Republicans, especially in the South.

Though violent crimes are the primary focus of law-and-order advocates, quality-of-life crimes are sometimes also included under the law-and-order umbrella, particularly in local elections. A tough stance on this matter greatly helped Rudy Giuliani win two terms as mayor of New York in the 1990s, and was also widely cited as propelling Gavin Newsom to victory over a more liberal opponent in San Francisco's mayoral election of 2003.

Richard Riordan also became Los Angeles' new mayor in 1993 for the first time in 20 years after Tom Bradley retired.

Platt (1995) argues that the intensity of law-and-order campaigns represents a significant shift in criminal justice that involves modernization and increased funding for police technology and personnel, privatization of security services and surveillance, higher rates of incarceration, and greater racial inequality in security and punishment.

The phrase was used repeatedly by Donald Trump in his presidential nomination acceptance speech in 2016, which Salon.com interpreted as an intentional reference to Nixon's use of the term. Politico Magazine reported that the rhetoric was at odds with the crime rates being at 50-year lows in the country.

International issue

"Law and order" has been a political rallying call in the United Kingdom, particularly under Margaret Thatcher (Leader of the Conservative Party 1975–1990; Prime Minister 1979–1990).

The term was parodied as "Laura Norder", and entered popular culture, for example in the sarcastic song "Law & Order" by the Tom Robinson Band (1979).

Criticism

Critics of law-and-order politics commonly point to actual and potential abuses of judicial and police powers, including police brutality and misconduct, racial profiling, prison overcrowding, and miscarriages of justice. As an example, they argue that while crime in New York City dropped under Mayor Giuliani, reports of police brutality increased during the same period. This period included the fatal shootings of Amadou Diallo and Sean Bell, and the Abner Louima incident.

In extreme cases, civil unrest has broken out in retaliation against law-and-order politics, as happened in London's Brixton district in 1981, Los Angeles in 1992, France in 2005, and Ferguson, Missouri in 2014.

In 2009, Pennsylvania juvenile court judges Mark Ciavarella and Michael Conahan pleaded guilty in the "kids for cash" scandal of accepting money from private prison industry officials in exchange for sentencing over 1,000 youths to prison terms for minor offenses.

Maricopa County Sheriff Joe Arpaio, a role model of tougher sentencing campaigners for his hardline corrections policies, was investigated by the FBI – starting in 2009 – for alleged abuses of power and intimidation of dissenting officials, among other controversies.

A United States Supreme Court ruling in 2011, Brown v. Plata, ordered the State of California to cut its inmate population, citing prison overcrowding to be in violation of the Eighth Amendment.

One academic has argued that the term is used as a way to emphasize racial backlash in politics without appearing racist. By 2020, columnists and left-leaning groups in the United States were increasing criticism of the term as hypocritical and a dog whistle in response to the use of the term by Donald Trump and his supporters during the George Floyd protests, with one outlet stating "[t]hroughout this nation's history, appeals to law and order have been as much about defending privilege as dealing with crime." In the wake of the 2021 United States Capitol attack, criticism from columnists and outlets mounted on Republican politicians seen as "abandoning" or otherwise being hypocritical of being known as the "law and order party."

Order without law 
In a limited number of cases, it can be argued that order can be maintained without law. Robert Ellickson, in his book Order without Law: How Neighbors Settle Disputes, concluded that it is sometimes possible for order to be maintained without law in small groups. Ellickson examined rural Shasta County, California, in which cattle openly roam and sometimes destroy crops. He found that since social norms call for the cattle owner to pay for the damaged crops, the disputes are settled without law. According to Ellickson, not only is the law not necessary to maintain order in this case, but it is more efficient for social norms to govern the settling of disputes.

See also

 Authoritarianism
 Back to Basics (campaign)
 Culture war
 Demagogy
 Fascism
 Peace, order and good government (Commonwealth)
 Peace (common-law concept)
 Penal harm
 Penal populism
 Propaganda
 Three-strikes law
 War on Drugs
 Wedge issue
 Zero tolerance
 Zucht und Ordnung

References

Further reading
 
 
 
 
 

Political catchphrases
American political catchphrases
Conservatism in the United States